Fight Now TV was a Canadian English language specialty channel devoted to airing programming related to wrestling, boxing, mixed martial arts, and other combat sports. Along with airing live events, Fight Now TV also aired fight-related programming such as news, news magazines, taped sports events, and more.

The channel was founded and owned by Channel Zero Inc and was launched on May 24, 2011 as a 24-hour-a-day, seven-day-a-week combat sports channel. 
 The channel ceased broadcasting on June 30, 2014, citing difficulties achieving long-term viability due to difficulties within the sports genre such as industry consolidation, increased re-transmission fees, insufficient subscribers, and declining video margins.

References

External links
 Fight Now TV

Channel Zero (company)
Sports television networks in Canada
Television channels and stations established in 2011
English-language television stations in Canada
Television channels and stations disestablished in 2014